Everything Must Change is an album by American jazz vibraphonist Johnny Lytle which was recorded in 1977 for the Muse label.

Reception

AllMusic awarded the album 3 stars with a review by Scott Yanow stating, "Despite the rather limp title track, this is a nice '77 set with Lytle, strong organist Big John Patton, and some solid honking tenor sax by David Schnitter".

Track listing
All compositions by Johnny Lytle except where noted
 "Send In The Clowns" (Stephen Sondheim) - 5:40
 "Where or When" (Richard Rodgers, Lorenz Hart) - 4:32
 "The Village Caller" - 4:40
 "Everything Must Change" (Benard Ighner) - 3:50
 "Lela" - 10:08
 "It Wasn't Easy" - 4:52

Personnel 
Johnny Lytle - vibraphone  
John Patton - organ (tracks 1 & 3-6)
George Duvivier  - bass
Al Foster - drums
Paul Marshall - synthesizer (track 1)
Robbin Gordon - harp (track 1)
David Schnitter - tenor saxophone (track 5)

References 

1978 albums
Johnny Lytle albums
Muse Records albums
Albums produced by Ozzie Cadena
Albums recorded at Van Gelder Studio